Moscato is a surname. Notable people with the name include:

Carmelina Moscato, Canadian soccer coach and former professional player
Judah Moscato, Italian rabbi, poet, and philosopher of the sixteenth century
Vincent Moscato, former French international rugby player, now radio host, actor and comedian

See also 

 Moscato (disambiguation)